Itaipu Dam is a hydroelectric dam on the Brazil-Paraguay border.

Itaipu may also refer to:

 Itaipu Lake, located on the Brazil-Paraguay border
 Itaipu Airport, in Hernandarias, Paraguay
 Itaipu, Niterói, a district in Rio de Janeiro, Brazil
 Itaipu (Glass), a 1989 composition by Philip Glass
 Gurgel Itaipu E150, a 1975 Brazilian electric car named after the dam and power plant
 Gurgel Itaipu E400, a 1981 follow-up vehicle

See also
 Santa Terezinha de Itaipu, a municipality in Paraná, Brazil